Rayer Bazaar is a well-known thoroughfare in Dhaka, the capital city of Bangladesh. It is generally regarded as one of the historical areas of the city. Rayer Bazaar was founded during the colonial period most probably in the 19th century. It was the potters who first started to live here beside the Turag River. This Place was most probably named after someone titled Ray. It was easy to find the clays used to make pots in this area and spread it around by boats as it was situated near the river.

Address
Rayer Bazaar Bodhdhobhumi is located in Mohammadpur near Beribadh area in Dhaka District. This area is mainly an extension of the Turag River. The Martyred Intellectuals Memorial was established here on 14 December 1996 by daughter of Bangabandhu  Prime Minister Sheikh Hasina. Its completed in 1999.

History
During the Mughal period this place was famous for pottery and most of the potters of this region used to live in Rayer Bazar, because the famous laal mati (লাল মাটি) (Red Clay) was available in this place a lot. During the Mughal and British Colonial period, the red clay was not available in the neighbourhoods. As a result, the Potters of Rayer Bazar have a long tradition of working with this red clay. According to Dr. Wise, this place was known as "Kumartoli" during the Mughal period.

In the night of 14 December 1971, many of Bangladesh's intellectuals including professors, journalists, doctors, artists, engineers, and writers were rounded up in Dhaka. They were taken blindfolded to torture cells in Mirpur, Mohammadpur, Nakhalpara, Rajarbagh and other locations in different sections of the city. Later they were executed and thrown out in the swamps, at Rayerbazar.

Martyred Intellectuals Memorial

In memory of the martyred intellectuals of 1971, a Memorial is created in there. The 'Al-Badr' and 'Al-Shams' Group helped the West Pakistan Army to locate the intellectuals and slaughtered them and many other innocent peoples at night. After the massacre they brought the corpses and left them into the swamps of Rayer Bazaar. After the Liberation War, the people of Dhaka found out that all the dead bodies of many great intellectuals and innocent people are piled up in here."
Martyred Intellectuals Memorial is the memorial built for the memory of the martyred intellectuals of 1971. The memorial is built in the Boddhobhumi at Rayer Bazaar.

Present condition
Rayer Bazaar has become a densely populated area at present. The area is heavily polluted and living standard is very much low in this area. "The old pottery tradition is almost over. We can hardly find two or three potters in here".  The tannery at Hajaribaag near the Rayer Bazaar Boddhobhumi is one of the main reasons for polluting the area. The overgrowth of population has even created severe water problem in this area.

References

External links
 Historical places, National Tourism Organisation, Govt. of Bangladesh.

Neighbourhoods in Dhaka